David Saperstein may refer to:

 David Saperstein (rabbi), rabbi, lawyer, and Reform Jewish community leader
 David I. Saperstein, American entrepreneur, billionaire and farmer